Ollie Mohamed (February 7, 1925 - April 6, 2008) was a Democratic member of the Mississippi Senate in the mid-to-late 20th century and its President pro tempore in 1992.

Early life 
Ollie Mohamed was born on February 7, 1925, in Shaw, Mississippi. He was the oldest child and son of ethnically Syrian Lebanese-born Muslim merchant Hassan Mohamed and Ethel (Wright) Mohamed. Hassan's original name was Hassan Mohamed Shouman; his last name became his middle name due to a transcription error when he immigrated to the United States. Ollie and his siblings were raised as Baptists, their mother's faith. Mohamed attended Belzoni High School in Belzoni, Mississippi. In 1942, he was the first 18-year-old draft into World War II. Mohamed was a merchant and a farmer.

Political career 
He represented Mississippi's 30th senatorial district in the state senate from 1964 to 1968. After the districts were re-districted, he then represented the 19th district in the Senate from 1968 to 1972. In 1971, he sponsored legislation to create the Mississippi Bureau of Narcotics. He represented the state's 21st district in the Senate from 1980 to 1994. In 1992, he was the President pro tempore of the Mississippi Senate. He was defeated for re-election in 1992 when the districts were changed again. He later worked as a legislative lobbyist for Governor Kirk Fordice. He died in his home in Belzoni, Mississippi, on April 6, 2008.

Personal life 
Mohamed was married to Annelle Horne. They had six children.

References

Works cited 
 

1925 births
2008 deaths
People from Belzoni, Mississippi
Presidents pro tempore of the Mississippi State Senate
Democratic Party Mississippi state senators
American politicians of Syrian descent
American politicians of Lebanese descent